Sarapiquí is the tenth canton in the province of Heredia in Costa Rica.

History
The canton was established by law on November 18, 1970.

The Sarapiquí River played a very important role in the defense of national sovereignty, because on 10 April 1856, the filibusters under the command of the American William Walker arrived in Costa Rica through the Sarapiquí River, where the battle of Sardinal was fought. This river and region allowed the export of goods to Europe.

Geography 
Sarapiquí has an area of  km².

The canton includes the major portion of the Province of Heredia, and is named for its major waterway, the Sarapiquí River. The western half of the canton gives way to the San Carlos Plain. Heredia's provincial border with Alajuela, which runs through the middle of the San Carlos Plain, marks the canton's western limit. The southern boundary of the canton is established by La Virgen River.

Economy 
The main agricultural activities in the region are: banana, pineapple, coffee, corn, cocoa, cardamom, citrus, palm, foliage, ornamental plants, fruit trees and livestock.

The tourism has had an important development in the last years, thanks to the recreational activities practiced in the Sarapiquí river.

Demographics

For the 2011 census, Sarapiquí had a population of  inhabitants.

Districts
The canton of Sarapiqui is divided into five districts:

 Puerto Viejo
 La Virgen
 Horquetas
 Llanuras del Gaspar
 Cureña

Transportation

Road transportation 
The canton is covered by the following road routes:

References

 National Institute of Statistics and Censuses
 Municipality of Sarapiquí

Cantons of Heredia Province
Populated places in Heredia Province